Isacco Ravaioli, best known as Isarco Ravaioli (3 March 1933 – 15 February 2004), was an Italian film actor.

Life and career 
Born  in Ravenna, Ravaioli obtained a diploma of teaching in his hometown, and he started working as a primary school teacher. Later, driven by his passion for cinema, he moved to Rome where he first attended the drama school held by Peter Scharoff, soon obtaining his first film roles, and then enrolled the Centro Sperimentale di Cinematografia, graduating in 1957. Ravaioli appeared in dozens of films until his retirement in the 1980s, mainly of adventure and peplum genre.

Selected filmography 

 La storia del fornaretto di Venezia (1952)
 La muta di Portici (1952)
 Francis the Smuggler (1953) - Marinaio al bar (uncredited)
 Capitan Fantasma (1953) - (uncredited)
 La figlia del forzato (1953)
 La schiava del peccato (1954) - (uncredited)
 Accadde di notte (1956)
 Wives and Obscurities (1956) - Giovanotto del paese
 Il bacio del sole (Don Vesuvio) (1958)
 Caporale di giornata (1958) - Soldier Rossi
 Bir kadin tuzagi (1958)
 Le confident de ces dames (1959)
 The Black Archer (1959) - Young conspirator
 La cento chilometri (1959) - Friend of Elena's Brother
 Bad Girls Don't Cry (1959)
 Perfide.... ma belle (1959)
 Il principe fusto (1960)
 The Vampire and the Ballerina (1960) - Luca
 The Warrior Empress (1960)
 Caravan petrol (1960) - Fazil's Soldier
 Un giorno da leoni (1961)
 The Valiant (1962)
 A Very Private Affair (1962)
 Vulcan, Son of Giove (1962) - Mercurius - Messenger of the Gods
 My Son, the Hero (1962) - Centinela
 79 A.D. (1962) - Licinius
 The Old Testament (1962) - Giovanni
 La mano sul fucile (1963)
 Casablanca, Nest of Spies (1963)
 I maniaci (1964) - Eros, the Villa's Butler (segment 'Il week-end')
 Last Plane to Baalbeck (1964) - Franz
 Sandokan to the Rescue (1964) - Sitar
 Super rapina a Milano (1964)
 Squillo (1964)
 Heroes of Fort Worth (1965) - Lt. Webb
 Secret Agent 777 (1965) - Professor's Assistant
 Wild, Wild Planet (1966) - Quarters Sergeant
 War of the Planets (1966) - Hosting Victim
 Djurado (1966) - Marshal Ray Daller
 Bel Ami 2000 oder Wie verführt man einen Playboy? (1966)
 La morte viene dal pianeta Aytin (1967) - Norton's Communications Technician
 LSD - Inferno per pochi dollari (1967) - Alex Corey
 Wanted Johnny Texas (1967) - Sergeant Mills, Texas Rangers
 Danger: Diabolik (1968) - Valmont's Henchman
 Satanik (1968) - Max Bermuda
 Either All or None (1968) - Solitario
 Deadly Inheritance (1968) - Jules
 Colpo sensazionale al servizio del Sifar (1968) - Special Agent George Hansen
 Heads or Tails (1969) - Sheriff
 Quel giorno Dio non c'era (Il caso Defregger) (1969) - German Officer
 The Invincible Six (1970) - Giorgio
 Kill Django... Kill First (1971) - Doc
 I giardini del diavolo (1971) - Major Briggs
 Let's Go and Kill Sartana (1971) - Sheriff Chet Hammer
 La verità secondo Satana (1972) - Robert
 Il seme di Caino (1972) - Giovanni
 La rebelión de los bucaneros (1972)
 La vergine di Bali (1972) - Dr. Arnold
 Rivelazioni di uno psichiatra sul mondo perverso del sesso (1973) - Professor Strafford
 The Hanging Woman (1973) - Town's Mayor
 Mania (1974) - Lailo
 La linea del fiume (1976) - SS tedesco in casa del Dr. Roder
 Kaput Lager - Gli ultimi giorni delle SS (1977) - Lt. Keller
 Gli uccisori (1977) - Stephen
 Deadly Chase (1978) - Alberto Bonci, 'Il barone'
 Tough to Kill (1978)
 Quando l'amore è oscenità (1980) - Dr. Roberts
 Febbre a 40! (1980) - Robert
 Il trono di fuoco (1983) - Isar
 Il momento magico (1984) - Friend of the stripper (final film role)

References

External links 

 

 

1933 births
2004 deaths
20th-century Italian male actors
Italian male film actors
Centro Sperimentale di Cinematografia alumni
People from Ravenna